Alysa Nahmias is an American filmmaker and the founder of Ajna Films.

Life
Nahmias is originally from Tucson, Arizona. She holds degrees from The Gallatin School of Individualized Study at New York University and Princeton University. She is married to graphic designer Rob Carmichael of SEEN Studio

Career
In 2011, Nahmias directed and produced the feature documentary Unfinished Spaces, about the Cuban National Art Schools, with Benjamin Murray. The film won an Independent Spirit Award in 2012 and is part of the Museum of Modern Art's permanent collection.

Nahmias directed and produced the 2019 documentary The New Bauhaus chronicling the art and design icon, László Moholy-Nagy. The film features Moholy-Nagy's daughter, Hattula, and contemporary art curator Hans Ulrich Obrist reads Moholy-Nagy's words on screen.

Nahmias directed and produced the 2021 film Art & Krimes by Krimes, which centers on visual artist Jesse Krimes as he navigates his life and artistic career following incarceration. Art & Krimes by Krimes also features the stories and artwork of artists Russell Craig, Gilberto Rivera, and Jared Owens. The film was purchased for distribution by MTV Documentary Films

Her producing credits include Unrest, by director Jennifer Brea, which won the Special Jury Award for Best Editing at the 2017 Sundance Film Festival, No Light and No Land Anywhere, by director Amber Sealey with creative advisor Miranda July; Shield and Spear, by director Petter Ringbom; What We Left Unfinished, by director Mariam Ghani; and Afternoon of a Faun: Tanaquil Le Clercq by director Nancy Buirski with creative advisor Martin Scorsese. In 2020 Alysa executive produced Weed & Wine, directed by Rebecca Richman Cohen which premiered at Hot Docs, Deauville, and DOC NYC film festivals in 2020. Nahmias served as executive producer for I Didn’t See You There directed by Reid Davenport, which won the 2022 Sundance Film Festival U.S. Documentary Directing Award.

Nahmias has been featured in Filmmaker Magazine as an independent film innovator. She is a 2019 Sundance Institute Momentum Fellow and a 2020 Film Independent Fellow. Nahmias co-authored a Sundance Creative Distribution Case Study on Unrest and has written about documentary grant writing for MovieMaker Magazine

Nahmias is a co-founder of FWD-Doc, a non-profit organization which supports disabled filmmakers and entertainment industry workers. Other co-founders include Jim LeBrecht, Day Al-Mohamed and Lindsey Dryden.

Filmography

References 

American film producers
American documentary film directors
Filmmakers from Arizona
People from Tucson, Arizona
New York University alumni
Princeton University alumni
Year of birth missing (living people)
Living people
21st-century American women
American women documentary filmmakers